The Glover-McLeod-Garrison House, in Marietta, Georgia, also known as Bushy Park and as Rocking Chair Hill, is a Greek Revival-style house which was built in 1847-51 and is listed on the National Register of Historic Places (NRHP).  It was built and/or designed by Willis Ball.

It was built for entrepreneur John Heyward Glover, who sold it in 1851 and went on to build the Glover-Blair-Anderson House (c.1851) also in Marietta, said to be "one of the finest antebellum structures in Marietta", and also NRHP-listed as part of the Northwest Marietta Historic District.

It was listed with address 250 Garrison Rd., SE, but that part of the street is called Magnolia Chase Dr. as of 2017.

It was vacant from 1931 to 1939, then purchased and restored.

It was listed on the National Register in 1977.

References

National Register of Historic Places in Cobb County, Georgia

Greek Revival architecture in Georgia (U.S. state)
Buildings and structures completed in 1847